An Aerial Joyride is a 1916 American silent comedy film featuring Oliver Hardy.

Cast
 Oliver Hardy as Plump
 Billy Ruge as Runt
 Ray Godfrey as Sweetheart

See also
 List of American films of 1916
 Oliver Hardy filmography

References

External links

1916 films
1916 comedy films
1916 short films
American silent short films
Silent American comedy films
American black-and-white films
American aviation films
American comedy short films
1910s American films